Lance Darnell Kwaku Gross (born July 8, 1981) is an American actor. He is best known for his role as Calvin Payne on the TBS sitcom Tyler Perry's House of Payne and OWN sitcom Tyler Perry's The Paynes., as well as appearing in other Tyler Perry productions such as the Meet the Browns (2008) film and Tyler Perry's Temptations: Confessions of a Marriage Counselor (2013). He also co-starred in 2010's Our Family Wedding alongside Forest Whitaker, Carlos Mencia, America Ferrera, and Regina King. He also starred as Secret Service Agent Marcus Finley in NBC's political drama Crisis.

Early life and career
Gross was born in Oakland, California, the child of an African American mother and Ghanaian immigrant father, and later moved to Las Vegas, Nevada, to attend and graduate from Bonanza High School. He went on to attend Howard University, where he received a Bachelor of Arts in theater.  He then trained at The Ivanna Chubbuck Studio as well as the Tasha Smith Acting Studio.

Gross began his career by modeling for Karl Kani and appearing in music videos for artists such as Mary J. Blige, Rihanna and Mariah Carey. In 2006, he had minor roles in Eve and The Bernie Mac Show. It was while he was performing in the Tasha Smith Acting Studio that he was discovered by Tyler Perry. He was consequently cast as Calvin Payne on Perry's new sitcom House of Payne. In the show Gross plays Calvin, a young professional who has attended college for seven years. He has been awarded four NAACP Image Awards for Outstanding Supporting Actor in a Comedy Series for this role.

2008 saw Gross make his film debut in the romantic comedy Meet the Browns.  His next big screen appearance was in Our Family Wedding in 2010 alongside America Ferrera, in which they portrayed a recently engaged young couple whose wedding preparations are disrupted by their families. In 2012 he starred in the independent film The Last Fall, the story of a retired NFL player dealing with financial and family difficulties. Currently Gross plays a major role on the Fox musical drama Star.

In 2018, on OWN's The Paynes, he makes an appearance as a recurring character in the episodes "A Surprise for the Paynes", "Revelations of Payne" and "A Confrontation of Payne", along with Allen Payne, Demetria McKinney, Larramie "Doc" Shaw and China Anne McClain.

Personal life
In July 2006, Gross began dating actor Eva Marcille. The couple became engaged on December 24, 2008 and split up in March 2010. Later on May 23, 2015 Gross married fashion stylist Rebecca Jefferson  The couple are parents to two kids, one daughter, Berkeley Brynn Gross (born November 20, 2014), and one son, Lennon Lorin Gross (born July 10, 2018).

In November 2021 Gross became initiated as an official member of Kappa Alpha Psi.

Filmography

Film

Television

References

External links
 

1981 births
African-American male actors
American male film actors
American male television actors
Living people
American people of Ghanaian descent
Howard University alumni
Male actors from Oakland, California
21st-century American male actors
21st-century African-American people
20th-century African-American people